Roberto Saturnino Moya Sandoval (February 11, 1965 – May 21, 2020) was a Cuban athlete who mainly competed in the discus throw.

He was born in Havana, Ciudad de la Habana. He won the bronze medal at the 1992 Summer Olympics in this event, and his personal best is 65.68.

Moya became a Spanish citizen in August 2001.

Competition record

Notes

External links 
 
 

1965 births
2020 deaths
Cuban emigrants to Spain
Spanish male discus throwers
Cuban male discus throwers
Cuban people of African descent
Olympic athletes of Cuba
Olympic bronze medalists for Cuba
Athletes (track and field) at the 1992 Summer Olympics
Athletes (track and field) at the 1996 Summer Olympics
Pan American Games medalists in athletics (track and field)
Pan American Games gold medalists for Cuba
Athletes (track and field) at the 1991 Pan American Games
Athletes (track and field) at the 1995 Pan American Games
World Athletics Championships athletes for Cuba
Medalists at the 1992 Summer Olympics
Olympic bronze medalists in athletics (track and field)
Universiade medalists in athletics (track and field)
Central American and Caribbean Games gold medalists for Cuba
Competitors at the 1990 Central American and Caribbean Games
Universiade bronze medalists for Cuba
Central American and Caribbean Games medalists in athletics
Medalists at the 1989 Summer Universiade
Competitors at the 1994 Goodwill Games
Medalists at the 1991 Pan American Games
Medalists at the 1995 Pan American Games